Bandari Football Club is a Kenyan football club based in Mombasa.  The team play their home games at the Mbaraki Sports Club and the Mombasa County Stadium (the latter having four times greater seating capacity), and currently compete in the Kenyan Premier League after finishing the 2012 FKF Division One season as champions of Zone A.

The team played from 1960 to 1978 as LASCO Football Club, followed by an eight-year run as Cargo Football Club.  In 1985, the club merged with the Kenya Ports Authority team to form Bandari FC.

The club had played previously in the Kenyan Premier League, but was relegated after the 1997 season. Bandari was the first runners up in the KPL 2017,2018 and won the KPL SportPesa Supercup 2018 to earn a CAF CONFEDERATION CUP Qualifications spot.

The Dockers were placed against Al Ahly Shendi of Sudan and drew 0-0 on home turf before drawing 1-1 away to Shendi in Sudan eliminating the Sudan-based side. The second round they were placed with US Ben Guardane of Tunisia, and eliminated them in similar fashion   The team was disbanded in 1999. It was revived in 2004 and rapidly promoted from lower leagues back to the premier league. The club reached the final on Kenyan Cup in 1986 but was beaten by Gor Mahia (who qualified for the African Cup Winners' Cup and won the tournament).

Honours
Kenyan Premier League: 0
Kenyan Premier League 1st runners up 2017: 2
Kenyan Premier League 1st runners up 2018: 2
Kenyan Premier League 1st runners up 2019: 2
Kenyan Premier League 2nd runners up 2020: 3

FKF President's Cup: 1
2015

KPL Top 8 Cup: 0

Kenyan Super Cup: 1
2016|2019]]

SportPesa Shield 2019: 1
2019|2019]]

Management

Performance in CAF competitions
CAF Champions League: 0 appearances

CAF Confederation Cup: 2 appearances
2016

CAF Super Cup: 0 appearances

References

External links
 Futaa.com – Kenyan Football Portal

FKF Division One clubs
Football clubs in Kenya
Association football clubs established in 1985
Sport in Mombasa
1985 establishments in Kenya